Olearia algida, the alpine daisy-bush is a species of flowering plant in the family Asteraceae and is endemic to south-eastern Australia. It is a shrub with small, crowded, elliptic to narrow egg-shaped leaves with the narrower end towards the base and heads of white and cream-coloured, daisy-like flowers.

Description

Taxonomy
Olearia algida was first formally described in 1956 by Norman Arthur Wakefield in The Victorian Naturalist from specimens collected by A.J. Tadgell on Mount Bogong in 1922. The specific epithet (algida) is a Latin word meaning "cold".

Distribution and habitat
Alpine daisy-bush grows in heath, shrubland and grassland near swampy places in alpine and subalpine areas south from Mount Gingera in the Australian Capital Territory, through southern New South Wales to eastern Victoria and Tasmania.

References

Asterales of Australia
Flora of New South Wales
Flora of Tasmania
Flora of Victoria (Australia)
algida
Plants described in 1956
Taxa named by Norman Arthur Wakefield